Spaceland may refer to:

Places
 Houston Gulf Airport (IATA airport code: SPX; ICAO airport code: KSPX), League City, Texas, USA; formerly named Spaceland Airport
Spaceland, a nightclub in Los Angeles, California, USA

Literature
 Spaceland, a fictional location from the 1884 science fiction novel by Edwin A. Abbott, Flatland, and its sequels and adaptations
 Spaceland (novel), a 2002 science-fiction novel by Rudy Rucker, a sequel to Flatland
 Spaceland (comic book storyline) a comic storyline in the 2000AD comics illustrated by Edmund Bagwell
 Spaceland (videogaming) a fictional location in Call of Duty: Infinite Warfare, see List of zombie video games

Other uses
 Spaceland (2016 album), an Icelandic album by Sin Fang

See also
 Extraterrestrial real estate, land in outer space
 Land (disambiguation)
 Space (disambiguation)